Run, Jang-mi is a 2014 South Korean daily drama starring Go Joo-won and Lee Young-ah. It aired on SBS on Mondays to Fridays at 19:20 for 123 episodes from December 15, 2014 to June 5, 2015.

Plot
Baek Jang-mi (Lee Young-ah) was brought up in a wealthy family. On the day she marries Kang Min-chul (Jung Joon), her father dies suddenly. The family business is in financial problem and goes bankrupt. When Min-chul realizes that the Baek's family is in debt, he refuses to honour the marriage and breaks up with Jang-mi.

Jang-mi struggles to make a living, but soon finds a job in a rice cake shop. There she meets Hwang Tae-ja (Go Joo-won), the grandson of a food company president. At first they loggerheads with each other, they soon develop feelings for each other.

Cast

Main characters
Go Joo-won as Hwang Tae-ja
Lee Young-ah as Baek Jang-mi
Ryu Jin as Jang Joon-hyuk
Jung Joon as Kang Min-chul
Yoon Joo-hee as Kang Min-joo
Lee Si-won as Hwang Tae-hee

Supporting characters
Yoon Yoo-sun as Na Yeon-joo
Kwon Soo-hyun as Baek Jang-soo 
Jeon Gook-hwan as company president Hwang
Jung Ae-ri as Madam Hong
Kim Chung as Professor Choi
Lee Sang-woo as Teacher Kang
Lee Dae-yeon as Jang Myung-moon
Kim Hyung-beom as Bong Ma-bong

Awards and nominations

References

External links
Run, Jang-mi official SBS website 

Seoul Broadcasting System television dramas
Korean-language television shows
2014 South Korean television series debuts
2015 South Korean television series endings
South Korean romance television series
South Korean melodrama television series
Television series by HB Entertainment